The 1959 Grand Prix motorcycle racing season was the 11th F.I.M. Road Racing World Championship Grand Prix season. The season consisted of seven Grand Prix races in five classes: 500cc, 350cc, 250cc, 125cc and Sidecars 500cc. It began on 17 May, with French Grand Prix and ended with Nations Grand Prix in Italy on 6 September.

1959 Grand Prix season calendar

† Race did not count towards the World Championship.

†† The Nations Grand Prix also held a non-championship 175 cc race, won by the Italian, Francesco Villa.

Standings

Scoring system
Points were awarded to the top six finishers in each race. Only the four best races were counted in all five classes: the Sidecars, 125cc, 250cc, 350cc and 500cc championships.

500cc final standings

350cc Standings

250cc Standings

125cc Standings

References
 Büla, Maurice & Schertenleib, Jean-Claude (2001). Continental Circus 1949-2000. Chronosports S.A. 

Grand Prix motorcycle racing seasons
Grand Prix motorcycle racing season